Vũ Xá may refer to several places in Vietnam, including:

 , a rural commune of Kim Động District.
 Vũ Xá, Bắc Giang, a rural commune of Lục Nam District.